The counts of Berga were the feudal lords of Berga, one of the Catalan counties created out of Besalú in 988 for a younger son of Oliba Cabreta. The viscounts of Berga ruled the city in name during the rule of the counts of Besalú from the early tenth century.

Counts
Oliba (988-1002)
Wilfred (1002-1035)
Bernard I (1035-1050)
Berengar (1050)
Raymond (1050-1068)
William I (1068-1094)
William II (1094-1109) co-reigning with
Bernard II (1094-1117)
To the counts of Barcelona.

Viscounts
Brandai (905-?)
Onofred (c.950)
Bardina (1003-1017)
Dalmau I (1017-1067)
Bernat Dalmau (1067-1086)
Dalmau II Bernat (1086-1113)
Guisla (1113-?)
William I (?-1183)
William II (1183-1196)
Berengar (1196-1199)
Raymond (1199)
Sold to Peter II of Aragón.

See also
Vescomtat de Berga at Catalan Wikipedia.

Berga